The 1997 Ugandan Super League was the 30th season of the official Ugandan football championship, the top-level football league of Uganda.

Overview
The 1997 Uganda Super League was contested by 16 teams and was won by Kampala City Council FC, while Maji, Old Timers of Mbarara FC, Natete and Telestars were relegated.

League standings

Leading goalscorer
The top goalscorers in the 1997 season were Jackson Mayanja (Kampala City Council FC) and Charles Ogwang (Umeme FC) with 18 goals each.

Footnotes

External links
 Uganda - List of Champions - RSSSF (Hans Schöggl)
 Ugandan Football League Tables - League321.com

Ugandan Super League seasons
1
Uganda
Uganda